The 2001 Fordham Rams football team was an American football team that represented Fordham University during the 2001 NCAA Division I-AA football season. Fordham finished third in the Patriot League. 

In their third year under head coach Dave Clawson, the Rams compiled a 7–4 record. Chris Breen, Maurice Briscoe, Tony Downs, Mark Manno and Joe Wyda were the team captains. This was Fordham's first season with an overall winning record since joining the Patriot League in 1990.

The Rams outscored opponents 329 to 243. Their 5–2 conference record placed third in the Patriot League standings, half a game behind second place. The 5–1 Colgate Raiders played fewer league games because they did not match up against the newest member of the conference, Georgetown, while Fordham did. 

When the September 11 attacks disrupted the following weekend's college football games, Fordham was the last Patriot League member to cancel its scheduled game, making the announcement on Friday afternoon just 24 hours before kickoff. The Rams and crosstown rival Columbia Lions had initially hoped to play the game as a sign of New York City resiliency.

Unlike the other Patriot League teams, which played a 10-game schedule in 2001, Fordham chose to reschedule and play the Columbia matchup at the end of the year, on Thursday, November 22. This was the first time since the "Seven Blocks of Granite" era that Fordham had played a game on Thanksgiving Day; that 1936 season-ender was also against a local opponent, New York University.

Fordham played its home games at Jack Coffey Field on the university campus in The Bronx, in New York City.

Schedule

References

Fordham
Fordham Rams football seasons
Fordham Rams football